VYP (Voice of the Young People) is the debut album by rapper Lil Mama released in April 2008, which includes the singles "Lip Gloss", "G-Slide (Tour Bus)", and "Shawty Get Loose" (featuring Chris Brown and T-Pain). The album's fourth single, "What It Is (Strike a Pose)" was released in July 2008, replacing "L.I.F.E."  Producers for the album include Cool & Dre, Scott Storch, The Runners and Dr. Luke. VYP debuted at number 25 on the U.S. Billboard 200 chart, and has since sold 66,200 copies in the United States.  As of May 22, 2010 the album has sold over 442,000 copies in the United States.

Track listing
 "Intro" – 1:08
 "Lip Gloss" – 4:04
 "One Hit Wonder" (featuring DJ Khaled) – 3:27
 "Get Loose Request" (Skit) – 0:11
 "Shawty Get Loose" (featuring Chris Brown and T-Pain) – 3:34
 "What It Is (Strike a Pose)" (featuring T-Pain) – 3:58
 "G-Slide (Tour Bus)" (featuring Kadar) – 3:31
 "Gotta Go Deeper" (Skit) – 0:14
 "Stand Up" – 3:36
 "L.I.F.E " – 3:57
 "College" (featuring Yirayah) – 4:00
 "Emotional Rollercoasters" (Skit) – 0:28
 "Broken Pieces" – 3:47
 "Swim" – 4:22
 "Truly in Love" (featuring Peter Toh) – 4:07
 "Look at My Life" (Skit) – 1:01
 "Make It Hot (Put It Down)" – 3:13
 "Pick It Up" – 3:45

Deluxe edition bonus tracks
"On Fire" – 3:15
"Girlfriend" (Dr. Luke remix; Avril Lavigne featuring Lil Mama)

Japanese bonus track
"Never Let Go" – 4:02

Deluxe edition bonus DVD
"Lip Gloss" (music video)
"Shawty Get Loose" (music video)

Charts

Release history

References

2008 debut albums
Albums produced by Dr. Luke
Albums produced by Cool & Dre
Albums produced by the Runners
Albums produced by Scott Storch
Albums produced by T-Pain
Jive Records albums
Lil Mama albums